Mau Tat is a village in Sha Tin District, Hong Kong.

Administration
Mau Tat is a recognized village under the New Territories Small House Policy.

See also
 Kau Yeuk (Sha Tin)
 Sha Tin Pass

References

External links

 Delineation of area of existing village Mau Tat (Sha Tin) for election of resident representative (2019 to 2022)

Villages in Sha Tin District, Hong Kong